The 2021–22 F.C. Copenhagen season is the club's 30th Anniversary season in existence and the 30th consecutive season in the top flight of Danish football. In addition to the domestic league, Copenhagen will participate in this season's editions of the Danish Cup and the inaugural UEFA Europa Conference League. The season covers the period from 1 July 2021 to 30 June 2022.

Players

Current squad

Youth players in use

Out on loan

Non-competitive

Pre-season

Mid-season

Atlantic Cup

Competitions

Overview

Competition record

Superliga

Regular season

Results by round - Regular season

Championship round

Results by round - Championship round

Regular season

Championship round

Danish Cup

UEFA Conference League

Group stage

Knockout phase

Round of 16
The round of 16 draw was held on 25 February 2022.

Statistics

Appearances 

This includes all competitive matches and refers to all squad members playing throughout the season, regardless of their current roster status.

Goalscorers 

This includes all competitive matches.

Assists 

This includes all competitive matches.

Clean sheets 

This includes all competitive matches.

Disciplinary record 

This includes all competitive matches.

References

External links

F.C. Copenhagen seasons
Copenhagen
Copenhagen